Xavier Montelongo (born February 26, 1992 in East Los Angeles, California) Mexican American professional boxer in the Featherweight division.

Amateur career
Montelongo had over 200 bouts, with 40 amateur titles and 20 national titles. Xavier even holds an amateur win over undefeated Light Middleweight prospect Bobby Lynn Bryant at the 2008 National Jr. Golden Gloves Championships finals.

Professional career
In October 2011, Montelongo beat José García to win his professional debut. This bout was held at the Club Nokia in Los Angeles, California.

http://www.thesweetscience.com/news/articles/20984-east-las-xavier-montelongo-wins-california-state-title

In June 2015 Montelongo wins the vacant U.S.A California State Featherweight Title

http://boxrec.com/title/USCA?division=Featherweight

References

External links
Xavier Montelongo on Facebook
Xavier Montelongo on Myspace

American boxers of Mexican descent
Boxers from California
Lightweight boxers
1992 births
Living people
American male boxers
People from East Los Angeles, California